Trixter is a German visual effects studio, with divisions in Munich and Berlin.  Founded in 1999 by Simone Kraus Townsend and Michael Coldewey, the company was acquired in August 2018 by Cinesite.

The company's credits include Captain Marvel (2019), Black Panther (2018), Spider-Man: Homecoming (2017), Thor: Ragnarok (2017) and Guardians of the Galaxy Vol. 2 (2017).

Selected credits
Percy Jackson & the Olympians: The Lightning Thief (2010)
Iron Man 2 (2010)
Green Lantern (2011)
X-Men: First Class (2011)
Captain America: The First Avenger (2011)
Journey 2: The Mysterious Island (2012)
Cloud Atlas (2012)
The Avengers (2012)
Iron Man 3 (2013)
White House Down (2013)
Seventh Son (film) (2014)
Captain America: The Winter Soldier (2014)
Avengers: Age of Ultron (2015)
Pixels (2015)
Ant-Man (2015)
Captain America: Civil War (2016)
Independence Day: Resurgence (2016)
Guardians of the Galaxy Vol. 2 (2017)
The Fate of the Furious (2017)
Thor: Ragnarok (2017)
Spider-Man: Homecoming (2017)
Black Panther (2018)
Lost in Space: Season 1 (2018)
Captain Marvel (2019)
Sonic The Hedgehog (2020)
Sonic the Hedgehog 2 (2022)
Doctor Strange in the Multiverse of Madness (2022)
Lightyear (2022)

References

External links 
 

Visual effects companies
German companies established in 1999